ν Tauri, Latinized as Nu Tauri, is a single star in the zodiac constellation of Taurus. It is a white-hued star and is visible to the naked eye with an apparent visual magnitude of +3.91. This object is located 117 light years from the Sun based on parallax, but is drifting closer with a radial velocity of −6 km/s.

This object is an A-type main-sequence star with a stellar classification of A0.5Va. It is 206 million years old and is rotating with a projected rotational velocity of 83 km/s. The star has 2.25 times the mass of the Sun and 2.87 times the Sun's radius. It is radiating 28 times the luminosity of the Sun from its photosphere at an effective temperature of 7,836 K.

Nu Tauri has a magnitude 9.21 visual companion at an angular separation .

References

A-type main-sequence stars
Taurus (constellation)
Tauri, Nu
BD+05 0581
Tauri, 038
025490
018907
1251